Reinhold Muchow (21 December 1905 in Berlin – 12 September 1933 in Bacharach) was a Nazi Party politician. Especially prized in the early years of the movement for his organisational skills, he was associated with the economically left wing of the party.

A native of the gritty Neukölln district of Berlin, Muchow was one of the Alter Kämpfer of the Nazi Party. He was associated with the Strasser brothers and set up a Central Union of the Unemployed in an attempt to attract new members to the party before this initiative was closed down by the central leadership. He became leader of the Greater Berlin Gau 1 in 1925 and here he established the Muchow Plan, a cell-based structure for Nazi Party organisation on a local level which proved important in the growth of the party. Muchow's organisational talents impressed Joseph Goebbels and in 1928 he was given charge of organisation for the entire city where his plan became the standard for party structure across Germany. In fact Muchow's structure was strongly influenced by the cell structure of the Communist Party. 

At the same time he was also put in charge of a new Sekretariat fur arbeiterangelegenheiten, later called the Organisation of National Socialist Factory Cells, which sought to build up support for the Nazi Party among industrial workers. He was later sent to the German Labour Front where he revamped that group's organisation, setting up fourteen new units. He died in an accident in the Rhineland in September 1933 and was widely mourned by the Nazi hierarchy.

See also 

 Muchow Plan

References 

1905 births
1933 deaths
Nazi Party politicians
Politicians from Berlin
Accidental deaths in Germany
Road incident deaths in Germany
20th-century Freikorps personnel
People from Neukölln